Camp Sheridan may refer to:
 Camp Sheridan (Alabama), a WWI-era post in Alabama
 Camp Sheridan (Nebraska), a post established in northwestern Nebraska
 Camp Sheridan (Wyoming), the original name of Fort Yellowstone.